From May to June 1968, television technicians and journalists at channel ORTF striked. This strike would play an important role in May 68 in France.

Background

The strike became as a reaction to government interference with editorial coverage of political topic on French television.

This resulted in a nationwide strike by employees of ORTF television. This affected French television as ORTF had a 65% share of the television audience at the time.

Reception

The television strike was widely condemned by the mainstream media such as Le Monde.

References

 
France
1968 in France
1968 in French television